The name Paoro (Echo) appears in John White's English translation of a Māori story attributed by him to the Ngāti Hau tribe, as a personal name meaning 'Echo'. However, in the Māori language original which White also supplies, the name Paoro does not appear – instead the word used is 'pari-kārangaranga', "echoing cliff". In the Māori story, Mārikoriko (Twilight) is the first woman, created by Ārohirohi (Shimmering heat) from the heat of the sun and the echoing cliff.  She married Tiki, the first man, and gave birth to Hine-kau-ataata (Woman floating in shadows).

Legendary Māori people